His Wife's Mother is a 1932 British comedy film directed by Harry Hughes and starring Jerry Verno, Molly Lamont and Jack Hobbs. It is an adaptation of the stage farce The Queer Fish by William Matthew Scott, pen name Will Scott. The film was made at Elstree Studios by British International Pictures. The film's sets were designed by the art director John Mead.

Synopsis
When a newly-married man's mother-in-law sees him with another woman and mistakenly believes he is having an affair, he goes to extraordinary lengths to try to convince her otherwise. With the assistance of his valet and friend he attempts to prove that she saw his double, a dangerous jewel thief.

Cast
 Jerry Verno as Henry
 Molly Lamont as Cynthia  
 Jack Hobbs as Eustace  
 Renee Gadd as Tony 
 Gus McNaughton as Joy  
 Marian Dawson as Mrs. Trout  
 Jimmy Godden as Mr. Trout  
 Hal Gordon as Munro

References

Bibliography
 Low, Rachael. Filmmaking in 1930s Britain. George Allen & Unwin, 1985.
 Wood, Linda. British Films, 1927-1939. British Film Institute, 1986.

External links

1932 films
British comedy films
British black-and-white films
1932 comedy films
Films directed by Harry Hughes
Films shot at British International Pictures Studios
British films based on plays
Films set in London
Films set in England
1930s English-language films
1930s British films
English-language comedy films